The Kyrgyz State Technical University named after Iskhak Razzakov is a university in Bishkek, Kyrgyzstan. Formerly the university was known as the Frunze Polytechnic Institute (Russian: Фрунзенский политехнический институт/Frunzenskiy polytekhnicheskiy institut). It was founded in 1954.

Faculties

Informational Technologies
Management and information science in technical systems
Computer engineering, computing machinery, complexes, systems and networks
Software system of computing machinery and automated systems
Radio engineering
Designing and technology of radio electronics
Connection networks and communication  systems
Radio communication, broadcasting (system) and television

Power Engineering
Electric stations
Power engineering and networks
Relay protection and automatization of electrical power system
Power Energy supply (in brunches)
Renewable sources of energy
Electro technics (in branches)
Electric drive and automation of industrial plant and technological complexes
Thermoelectric power station
Safety of technological processes and productions

Transport and Machine-construction
Automobile and automobile industry
Exploitation and service of transport technological machinery and equipment 
Organization of transportation and management at transport (by all kinds of vehicle)
Organization and safety of traffic
Technology of machine-constructing
Equipment and technology of welding industry
Constructing and manufacturing products from composite material
Machines  and technology for increasing wear resistant and reconstruction of machines and apparatus details
Automation  of technological processes and industries (on branches)
Standardization and certification
Metrology and metrological supply
Mechatronics  and robotic
Dynamics and  machine durability
Professional education
Technology of printing industry

Institute of Management and Business
Management of organizations
Informational systems and technologies
Journalism 
Economics and management of enterprise  (in branches)
Business accounting, financial audit and analysis

Technological Faculty
Technology of sewing production
Technology of leather and fur wear
Design of sewing wear
Technology of leather wear
Designing of leather products
Decorative designing of costume
Technology of catering products
Technology of canned products, food concentrates of barmy products and wine making
Technology of sugary products
Technology of meat and meat products
Technology of milk and milk products
Technology of bread, macaroni and confectionery 
Technology of reprocessing and storage of grain
Machines and apparatus of food production
Food engineering of small industries
Standardization and certification of food products
Management (specialization: management and marketing in restaurant and hotel business)
Chemist-researcher, Chemist - ecologist
Protection in emergency situation
Engineering protection of environment

Kyrgyz-German Technical
Technology, equipment and automation of machine-constructing industries
Technology and management of machine-constructing industry
Transport – telematic logistic

Institute of Mining and Mining Technologies

Metallurgy and Geo-ecology Department
Metallurgy of ferrous metal
Metallurgy of non-ferrous metal
Mineral processing
Geo ecology
Environmental protection and racial use of natural resources
Engineering protection of environment
Applied information science in ecology

Mining
Blasting operations
Underground workings of mineral deposit
Open mining researches
Mine underground construction
Applied geodesy
Technology and equipment (mining machines and equipment)
Electro technology, electro mechanics, electro technics (electro mechanics of mining industry)

Geological Prospecting Faculty
Geophysical methods of search and prospecting of mineral deposits
Geological survey of groundwater and engineering-geological investigations
Geology of oil and gas
Applied geochemistry, petrology, mineralogy 
Technology and exploration technique of mineral deposits
Applied math and information science
Technology of materials processing
Protection in emergent situations
Nature management

Mining Economy Faculty
Economics (economics of enterprise in mineral resource industry)
Business accounting, financial audit and analysis (in mineral resource industry)
Management of organization (in mineral resource industry)
Information systems and technologies
Automation systems of information processing and management
Mathematical methods in economics
Applied math and information science

Department of  Vocational Education
Designing and modeling of sewing products
Designing and modeling of fur products
Technical service and repairing of electronics
Hairdressing craft

Moscow Power Energy Institute (TU)
Electrical networks and systems
Electrical supply
Automatic control and informatics of technical systems
Radio techniques
Computing machinery, complexes and networks

Notable alumni and faculty
Askar Akaev, former president of Kyrgyzstan
Arstanbek Nogoev, former mayor of Bishkek

References

External links
 Official site

Universities and institutes established in the Soviet Union
Educational institutions established in 1954
1954 establishments in the Soviet Union
Universities in Bishkek